Pamela Stewart (born 1946) is an American poet.

Life 
Stewart was born in Boston, Massachusetts and graduated from Goddard College with a BA, and from the University of Iowa with a MFA. Her work appeared in Seneca Review, and Calyx.

Family 
She married Ed Cothey in 1983; they lived in Cornwall, and in Hawley, Massachusetts, divorcing in 2016.

Awards
 1982 Guggenheim Fellowship

Works
"white moon"; "Nothing New Under the Gun", Salt River Review
 The St. Vlas Elegies (L’Epervier Press, 1977) 
 Cascades (L’Epervier Press, 1979) 
 Nightblind Raccoon, 1985, 
 Infrequent Mysteries Alice James Books, 1991, 
 The Red Window University of Georgia Press, 1997,

chapbook 
 Half-tones, Maguey Press, 1978, 
 The Ghost Farm Pleasure Boat Studio 2010. ,

Anthologies
Strong measures: contemporary American poetry in traditional forms, Editors: Philip Dacey, David Jauss, Harper & Row, 1986, 
Orpheus & Company: contemporary poems on Greek mythology, Editor: Debora de Nicola, University Press of New England, 1999,

References

Sources
  "Or Yours to Keep: The Poetry of Pamela Stewart", Where the angels come toward us: selected essays, reviews & interviews, David St. John, White Pine Press, 1995, 
 

1945 births
Goddard College alumni
University of Iowa alumni
Living people
American women poets
People from South Hadley, Massachusetts
People from Hawley, Massachusetts
21st-century American women